Marie-Antoinette Tonnelat (née Baudot) (March 5, 1912 – December 3, 1980) was a French theoretical physicist. She received her doctorate in 1939 under the supervision of Louis de Broglie. She is best known for her work related to Albert Einstein's Theory of Relativity. Her research focused on synthesizing the concepts gravity, electromagnetism, and nuclear forces within the basic framework provided by Einstein's theory of relativity. Along with the help of Einstein and Schrödinger, she played a role in developing Unified Field Theory.

Early life and education 
Marie-Antoinette Tonnelat was born on March 5, 1912, in Charolles, a commune in the Southern Burgundy region of France. She began her education at Lycée de Chalon-sur-Saône and finished her higher education at Lycée Louis-le-Grand. Initially, she pursued engineering, but she eventually obtained two degrees in the sciences and in philosophy at the University of Sorbonne in Paris. In 1935, Tonnelat pursued a doctorate in theoretical physics under Louis de Broglie at the Institut Henri Poincaré.

In 1939, Tonnelat wrote her PhD thesis with de Broglie on the Theory of the photon in a Riemannian space. The second portion of her thesis was written under the supervision of Jean Perrin on the subject of artificial radioactivity. In 1941, she finished her doctoral thesis, married with Jacques Tonnelat, and in 1945 went on to become a researcher at the French National Center for Scientific Research.

Research with de Broglie 
Her research focused on the field of relativistic spin-particles under the influence of a gravitational field. With de Broglie's "méthode de fusion", Tonnelat arrived at particles with maximal spin 2 from massive spin 1 particles, or photons. Spin 2 corresponded to the graviton. With her knowledge of the Klein Gordon equation, Maxwell's equations, and the linearized version of the equation for Einstein spaces, she examined the theory for a particle with spin 2 and called it "a unitary formalism". She published a paper in the early 1940s in which she established the standard commutation relations for the quantized spin-2 field. De Broglie supported her research in Unified Field Theory, but he himself stayed away from it and chose not to be directly involved with her studies.

Professional career 
Tonnelat spent much of her career as an educator. In 1945, she became a research director for eleven years at the French National Center for Scientific Research. After the war, Tonnelat spent some time in Dublin with scientist Erwin Schrödinger in order to focus on furthering the research she had done under de Broglie earlier in her life. Once again, she began to examine the concept of unitary formalism that comes from emerging spin-2 particles. Her time with Schrödinger inspired her interest in the relativity theory and sparked her correspondence with Albert Einstein as well. Her goal was to create one unified theory using the concepts and ideas discovered by Einstein and Schrödinger.

In 1956, she became a chair professor of physical theories at the Faculty of Science at the University of Paris. In parallel, she taught at the Institute of History of Science and Technology (directed by Gaston Bachelard) for twenty years.

In 1965, she published a second book on unified field theories that focused on the development of research in the field. There was only one chapter in the work that referred to her own research relating to Einstein and Schrödinger, but the book contained a few references to the doctoral theses that she had advised. Tonnelat's work was mainly concerned with establishing a connection between classic and quantum field theory. She debuts an alternative theory of gravitation (linear gravity), which she had studied in 1960, in this novel.

Despite her achievements, Tonnelat was known for her modesty. This attribute was exemplified in her published works, as each novel Tonnelat published seemed to become more modest in tone.

Awards and achievements 
For her work, Tonnelat received the "Pierson Perrin" prize in 1945 and the "Henri Poincaré" prize of the Academy of Sciences in 1970.

In 1953, just prior to Einstein's death, Marie-Antoinette Tonnelat was invited to Princeton to speak about the topic at the International Congress for the History of Science in Jerusalem. She gave many lectures throughout her career about her work related to the Theory of Relativity.

Tonnelat also produced a volume of novellas throughout her career, and she left an unpublished work about the history of theories of light and color.

Challenges faced 
Although her papers were eventually published at The Academy of Sciences in Paris, her work was subject to delays due to an interruption caused by German occupation of France in the early 1940s.

In 1980, Marie-Antoinette Tonnelat's deteriorating health made it difficult for her to continue giving her lectures. She died shortly after her last lecture.

References

Sources 
 
 
 
 

1912 births
1980 deaths
French physicists
Theoretical physicists
Quantum physicists
French women scientists
French women physicists
20th-century French scientists
20th-century French women